Classics is a 1995 compilation album by electronic musician Richard D. James, more commonly known by his pseudonym of the Aphex Twin.

The album collects James's early releases, including the Analogue Bubblebath, Digeridoo, and Xylem Tube EPs with a handful of other songs, including remixes of Mescalinum United's "We Have Arrived". It was released by R&S Records following James' success on Warp Records. James was not involved in the release of this compilation.

A remastered version of the album was released on 2 June 2008. The cover for this reissue resembles that of Selected Ambient Works 85–92, albeit with the black and white inverted.

Background 
James' first release was the 1991 12-inch EP Analogue Bubblebath on Mighty Force Records. In 1991, James and Grant Wilson-Claridge founded Rephlex Records to promote "innovation in the dynamics of Acid — a much-loved and misunderstood genre of house music forgotten by some and indeed new to others, especially in Britain". From 1991 to 1993 James released two Analogue Bubblebath EPs as AFX and an EP, Bradley's Beat, as Bradley Strider. Although he moved to London to take an electronics course at Kingston Polytechnic, he admitted to David Toop that his electronics studies were slipping away as he pursued a career in the techno genre. After leaving school James remained in the city, releasing albums and EPs on Warp Records and other labels under a number of aliases (including AFX, Polygon Window and Power-Pill); several of his tracks, released under aliases including Blue Calx and The Dice Man, appeared on compilations. Although he allegedly lived on the roundabout in Elephant and Castle, South London during his early years there, he actually resided in a nearby unoccupied bank.

In 1992 James also released the Xylem Tube EP and Digeridoo (first played by DJ Colin Faver on London's Kiss FM) as Aphex Twin, the Pac-Man EP (based on the arcade game) as Power-Pill, and two of his four 	
Joyrex EPs (Joyrex J4 EP and Joyrex J5 EP) as Caustic Window. "Digeridoo" reached #55 on the UK Singles Chart, and was later described by Rolling Stone as foreshadowing drum and bass. He wrote "Digeridoo" to clear up his audience after a rave. These early releases were on Rephlex Records, Mighty Force of Exeter and R&S Records of Belgium.

James had no creative input and was against the release of this compilation, accusing R&S of "milking as much money as they can out of me, because they know I’m not going to give them any more records."

Track listing

Notes 
 "Isopropanol" is an extended mix of "Isopropophlex" from James's Analogue Bubblebath.  The track time, 6:23, matches that of "Isopropophlex" from the original Digeridoo EP.
 "Analogue Bubblebath 1" is extended by a few seconds from its original version, with a different ending. It was the track included on some versions of the Digeridoo EP instead of "Isopropanol".
 "Tamphex" contains looping samples from a television advertisement for Tampax.
 This album was chosen as one of Q magazine's 50 heaviest albums of all time in July 2001, noted for its crunching, metallic malevolence.
 "We Have Arrived (Aphex Twin QQT mix)" was later re-released on the remix compilation 26 Mixes for Cash.
 A 3rd remix of We Have Arrived appeared on his 2015/2016 SoundCloud dump (a collection of 275+ "leftover" tracks from all eras of his career) under the title "Pcp 2 (unreleased version)".

Personnel 
 Aphex Twin – synthesizer, producer
 Richard D. James – producer
 The Mover – producer

Charts

References 

Aphex Twin compilation albums
1995 compilation albums
R&S Records compilation albums